Gwenyfred Bush, better known as Gwen Bush, (born 1930/1931) is an American politician from South Carolina, a member of the Republican Party. She was born in Chamberlain, South Dakota.

A former State Representative, she was a Republican nominee for a United States Senate seat in 1974 held by Ernest Hollings, a popular former Governor of South Carolina. This was also a year when Democrats made many gains while retaining all but one seat. Hollings defeated Bush with a large margin – 69.5–28.6%.

Bush is a resident of Greenville, South Carolina.

She is a namesake of the Gwen Bush Foundation.

Notes

See also
United States Senate elections, 1974

21st-century American women
Living people
Republican Party members of the South Carolina House of Representatives
Politicians from Greenville, South Carolina
Women state legislators in South Carolina
Year of birth missing (living people)